This list of North American animals extinct in the Holocene features animals known to have become extinct in the last 12,000 years on the North American continent. Animals recently extinct in the West Indies and Hawaii are in their own respective lists.

Many extinction dates are unknown due to a lack of relevant information.

Mammals

Prehistoric

Recent

Local

Birds

Prehistoric

Recent

Local

Reptiles

Amphibians

Fish

Recent

Local

Crustaceans

Insects

Arachnids

Molluscs

Undated

Recent

See also
 Holocene extinction
 Timeline of extinctions in the Holocene
 Settlement of the Americas
 List of South American animals extinct in the Holocene
 List of extinct animals
 List of extinct animals of the Hawaiian Islands
 List of extinct birds
 Extinct in the wild
 Lazarus taxon
 U.S. Fish and Wildlife Service
 IUCN Red List of Threatened Species

Notes

References

NA

Holocene
Holocene
North America

†Holocene